The history of the Jews in Andorra has its origins during World War II. There are between 100 and 150 Jews in Andorra. Most are descended from Sephardic Jews from Morocco. The first Jews came to Andorra during the Second World War, and the majority fled Morocco just prior to the Six-Day War. In 2000, the Jewish community opened and consecrated a synagogue and a cultural center.

See also
History of the Jews in Spain
History of the Jews in Morocco

External links
 Associació Cultural Israelita de les Valls d´Andorra

References

Andorra
Jews
Jews
Jews
Andorra